The TUM School of Management is the business school of the Technical University of Munich, located at its Munich campus.

It is triple accredited by the European Quality Improvement System (EQUIS), the Association to Advance Collegiate Schools of Business (AACSB) and the Association of MBAs (AMBA).

History 

In 1974, a Faculty for Business Administration and Social Sciences was established at TUM. In 2002, the TUM School of Management was founded by splitting up the Faculty for Economic and Social Sciences and integrating the Department of Business and Social Sciences at Weihenstephan.

Research 
The main research areas of the Department are:
 Innovation and Entrepreneurship
 Marketing, Strategy and Leadership
 Operations and Supply chain management
 Finance and Accounting
 Economics and Policy

Rankings 

The TUM School of Management has been rated as one of the best business schools in Germany.

In the national 2020 CHE University Ranking, the department is rated in the top group for the majority of criteria, including courses offered and research orientation.

References 

 
2002 establishments in Germany
Educational institutions established in 2002
Business schools in Germany
Research institutes in Munich